Maria Cristina Messa (born 8 October 1961) is an Italian doctor and academic, Minister of University and Research in the government of Mario Draghi.

Biography

Early and personal Life 
Born in Monza, she grew up in Milan, in Via Leopardi. She is married to Paolo, a doctor, and has two children. As of 2019, Beatrice, the elder, studies languages at the University of Milan and Giorgio, younger by five years, attends the scientific high school.

Career 
Graduated with honours in Medicine and Surgery (1986) with a speciality in Nuclear Medicine (1989) from the University of Milan.

She carried out several periods of study in the United States and England.

After a research experience at San Raffaele in Milan, she became associate professor at the University of Milano-Bicocca in 2001 and full professor in 2013.

From 2013 to 2019 she was rector of the Bicocca University, the first woman to hold this position at a Milanese university and the fourth in Italy. As a member of the Council of the Conference of Italian University Rectors (CRUI), she was in charge of Research. Among her various institutional positions, she was Vice-President of CNR from 2011 to 2015.

She also had several roles at European level. Since 2013, she was the Italian MIUR delegate in the Horizon 2020 programme.
  She appears in the Top 2% Scientists list of Stanford University for number of publications and citations, together with about four thousand researchers based in Italy out of the total 159,684 listed.

References

Living people
1961 births
Draghi Cabinet
People from Monza
21st-century Italian engineers
Italian women engineers
21st-century women engineers
21st-century Italian women politicians
University of Milan alumni
Academic staff of the University of Milano-Bicocca
Heads of universities in Italy
Women heads of universities and colleges